Leptogium is a genus of lichen-forming fungi in the family Collemataceae. It has about 110 species.

Species
Leptogium acadiense 
Leptogium adnatum  – South America
Leptogium andegavense 
Leptogium antarcticum 
Leptogium asiaticum 
Leptogium atlanticum 
Leptogium auriculatum  – South America
Leptogium austroamericanum 
Leptogium azureum 
Leptogium biloculare 
Leptogium brebissonii 
Leptogium britannicum  – Europe
Leptogium bullatulum 
Leptogium burgessii 
Leptogium chloromelum 
Leptogium cochleatum 
Leptogium compactum 
Leptogium cookii 
Leptogium coralloideum 
Leptogium corticola 
Leptogium crispatellum 
Leptogium cyanescens 
Leptogium davidii 
Leptogium enkarodes  – Australia
Leptogium epiphyllum 
Leptogium exaratum 
Leptogium faciifictum  – Australia
Leptogium fallax 
Leptogium granulans 
Leptogium hibernicum 
Leptogium hildenbrandii 
Leptogium hondae 
Leptogium hypotrachynum 
Leptogium javanicum 
Leptogium joergensenii 
Leptogium juressianum 
Leptogium kalbii  – Brazil
Leptogium kiyosumiense 
Leptogium krogiae 
Leptogium limbatum 
Leptogium longisporum 
Leptogium loriforme 
Leptogium mantiqueirense 
Leptogium marcellii 
Leptogium marginatum 
Leptogium marginellum 
Leptogium mastocheilum 
Leptogium menziesii 
Leptogium minutissimum 
Leptogium moluccanum 
Leptogium nylanderi 
Leptogium oceanianum  – New Zealand
Leptogium paramense 
Leptogium patwardhanii  – India
Leptogium pecten 
Leptogium pellobatum  – Australia
Leptogium philorheuma 
Leptogium phyllocarpum 
Leptogium poliophaeum  – Australia
Leptogium propaguliferum 
Leptogium quercicola 
Leptogium quilombense 
Leptogium rivulare 
Leptogium saturninum 
Leptogium saxatile 
Leptogium sphaerosporum  – Nepal
Leptogium streimannii  – Australia
Leptogium subazureum  – India
Leptogium subjuressianum  – Brazil
Leptogium sulcatum 
Leptogium taibaiense  – China
Leptogium tasmanicum 
Leptogium tectum 
Leptogium teretiusculum 
Leptogium thailandicum 
Leptogium transversum 
Leptogium tremelloides 
Leptogium verrucosum  – India
Leptogium victorianum 
Leptogium wangii  – China
Leptogium weii  – China
Leptogium wilsonii

Gallery

References

 
Lichen genera
Taxa described in 1810
Taxa named by Erik Acharius
Peltigerales genera